By-elections to the 34th Canadian Parliament were held to fill vacancies in the House of Commons of Canada between the 1988 federal election and the 1993 federal election. The Progressive Conservative Party of Canada led a majority government for the entirety of the 34th Canadian Parliament, though their number did decrease from by-elections.

Sixteen seats became vacant during the life of the Parliament. Six of these vacancies were filled through by-elections.

See also
List of federal by-elections in Canada

Sources
 Parliament of Canada–Elected in By-Elections 

1990 elections in Canada
1989 elections in Canada
34th